Chay Qushan may refer to:
 Chay Qushan, Ardabil
 Chay Qushan-e Bozorg, Golestan Province
 Chay Qushan-e Kuchek, Golestan Province